Lewisia stebbinsii is a rare species of flowering plant in the family Montiaceae known by the common name Stebbins' lewisia. It is endemic to California, where it is known from less than fifteen sites in the Inner North Coast Ranges of Mendocino and Trinity Counties, mainly in Mendocino National Forest.

Description
This is a perennial herb growing from a slender taproot and caudex unit. It produces a basal rosette of several fleshy, narrow leaves up to about 9 centimeters long. The inflorescence is made up of several prostrate stems extending from the rosette, each bearing 3 or more flowers. The flower has 7 to 10 pink to red petals with blunt or jagged tips 1 to 1.5 centimeters long.

External links
Jepson Manual Treatment
Photo gallery

stebbinsii
Endemic flora of California
Natural history of the California Coast Ranges
Mendocino National Forest
Natural history of Mendocino County, California
Natural history of Trinity County, California
Plants described in 1968
Critically endangered flora of California